Laureano Martín Tombolini (born 13 August 1976 in Santa Isabel, Santa Fe) is a retired Argentine football goalkeeper.

Career
Tombolini started his professional career with Rosario Central in 1998. he made his league debut in a 1–1 away draw against independiente on 18 October 1998. In 2002, he joined Colón de Santa Fe where he has played over 170 games for the club. He captained the club on many occasions and was generally recognised as the club's first choice goalkeeper.

In 2008, he was released by Colón. He then joined Instituto of the Argentine 2nd division. After a year playing in Córdoba, Tombolini signed with Olimpo, also of the 2nd division.

External links
 
 Argentine Primera statistics 

1976 births
Living people
Sportspeople from Buenos Aires Province
Argentine footballers
Association football goalkeepers
Rosario Central footballers
Club Atlético Colón footballers
Instituto footballers
Olimpo footballers
Sol de América de Formosa players
Juventud Unida Universitario players
Club Atlético Mitre footballers